The Walker McGregor Farmstead is a historic house in Yankton, South Dakota. It was built by Fergus Walker with chalk rock in 1876. It was purchased by Scottish-born Alexander McGregor in 1884, and it remained in the McGregor family until 1916. It was listed on the National Register of Historic Places in 1980.

References

	
National Register of Historic Places in Yankton County, South Dakota
Houses completed in 1876